Himalrandia is a genus of flowering plants belonging to the family Rubiaceae.

Its native range is Easterb Afghanistan to Southern Central China.

Species:

Himalrandia lichiangensis 
Himalrandia tetrasperma

References

Rubiaceae
Rubiaceae genera